No et moi is a 2010 French drama film directed and co-written by Zabou Breitman. It is based on the Prix des Libraires-winning novel of the same name by Delphine de Vigan.

Cast 
 Julie-Marie Parmentier as Nora ("No")
 Nina Rodriguez as Lou Bertignac
 Antonin Chalon as Lucas
 Bernard Campan as Lou's father
 Zabou Breitman as Lou's mother
 Grégoire Bonnet as Monsieur Vargas
 Guilaine Londez as Sylvie
 Eric Valero as Éric

References

External links 
 

2010 films
2010s coming-of-age drama films
2010s French-language films
Films directed by Zabou Breitman
Films about homelessness
French coming-of-age drama films
Films based on French novels
2010 drama films
Films about poverty in France
2010s French films